Gibberulus gibberulus, common name the humpbacked conch, is a species of sea snail, a marine gastropod mollusk in the family Strombidae, the true conchs.

There are two subspecies : 
 Gibberulus gibberulus albus (Mörch, 1850)
 Gibberulus gibberulus gibberulus (Linnaeus, 1758): represented as Gibberulus gibberulus (Linnaeus, 1758) (alternate representation)
 Gibberulus gibberulus gibbosus (Röding, 1798) (synonyms: Gibberulus gibbosus (Röding, 1798); Lambis gibbosa Röding, 1798 (original combination))

Description

The adult shell size varies between 30 mm and 70 mm. The smooth shell is gibbous. The spire is occasionally varicose. The body whorl is grooved at the base. The columella is smooth. The interior of the aperture is radiately striate. The shell is mottled and hieroglyphically marked with yellowish brown and white. The markings are often arranged in a few or numerous interrupted revolving bands. The aperture is tinged violaceous, scarlet or dark purplish brown.

Distribution
This species occurs in the Red Sea and in the Indian Ocean off Aldabra, Chagos, Kenya, Madagascar, Mauritius, Mozambique, the Seychelles and Tanzania; in the Pacific Ocean off Australia (Northern Territory, Queensland and Western Australia).

References

 Linnaeus, C. 1758. Systemae naturae per regna tria naturae, secundum classes, ordines, genera, species, cum characteribus, differetiis, synonymis, locis.v. Holmiae : Laurentii Salvii 824 pp.
 Mörch, O.A.L. 1852. Catalogus Conchyliorum quae reliquit d. Alphonso d'Aguirra & Gadea Comes de Yoldi, regis daniae cubiculariorum princeps, ordinis dannebrogici in prima classe & ordinis caroli Tertii eques. Part 1. Cephalophora. Copenhagen : Hafinae Vol. 1 170 pp.
 Frauenfeld, G.R. von 1869. Beitraege zur Fauna der Nicobaren. Verhandlungen der Zoologisch-Botanischen Gesellschaft in Wien XIX: 853-900
 Jousseaume, F. 1888. Description des Mollusques Recueillis par M. Le Dr. Faurot dans la Mer Rouge et le Golfe D'Aden. Mémoires de la Société Zoologique de France 1(42): 166-223
 Cotton, B.C. 1953. No. 3. Strombidae. Adelaide : Royal Society of South Australia, Malacological Section 4 pp. 1 pl. 
 Abbott, R.T. 1960. The genus Strombus in the Indo-Pacific. Indo-Pacific Mollusca 1(2): 33-146 
 Walls, J.G. (1980). Conchs, tibias and harps. A survey of the molluscan families Strombidae and Harpidae. T.F.H. Publications Ltd, Hong Kong. 
 Wilson, B. 1993. Australian Marine Shells. Prosobranch Gastropods. Kallaroo, Western Australia : Odyssey Publishing Vol. 1 408 pp.

External links
 

Strombidae
Gastropods described in 1758
Taxa named by Carl Linnaeus